WMBC may refer to:

Broadcast call signs
 WMBC-TV, a television station (channel 18, virtual 63) licensed to Newton, New Jersey, United States
 WMBC-LP, a defunct low-power radio station (100.9 FM) formerly licensed to Norton Shores, Michigan, United States
 WNMQ, a radio station (103.1 FM) licensed to Columbus, Mississippi, United States, which held the call sign WMBC from December 1984 to October 2008
 WMBC (college radio), the internet radio station (formerly AM) at University of Maryland, Baltimore County, formerly known as WUMD (college radio)

Other uses
 Wigan Metropolitan Borough Council
 Windsor Memorial Baptist Church
 Wholesale Broadband Managed Connect, a BT Wholesale product
 Wolverhampton Metropolitan Borough Council, former name of City of Wolverhampton Council, England